Eliza Butterworth (born 24 July 1993) is an English actress. She is best known for her role as Queen Aelswith of Wessex in the series The Last Kingdom, and is nominated for best supporting actress in a TV series at the National Film Awards UK for her performance as Heston the BBC Two miniseries The North Water in 2022.

Early life and education
Butterworth was born and raised in Lincoln, England on July 24, 1993 to an English father from Lancashire and an Italian American mother from Iowa. Her parents met in Nebraska where her mother was training to be a nurse and her father, in the Royal Air Force, was stationed at Offutt Air Force Base. She has dual citizenship.

From the age of 4 to 18, Butterworth attended Lincoln Minster School. She discovered acting through a school play and was Head Girl. She went on to graduate with a Bachelor of Arts in Acting from the Royal Academy of Dramatic Art (RADA) in 2014. Whilst training at RADA, Butterworth performed lead roles in The Daughter in Law and The Witch of Edmonton.

Career
Butterworth made guest appearances as Holly in DCI Banks and Lucy Hamilton in WPC 56, both in 2015. That same year, she began playing Aelswith, the wife of King Alfred the Great (David Dawson), in the BBC and later Netflix adaptation of The Last Kingdom. She started off in a recurring role for the first series before being promoted to the main cast for the subsequent four series.

In 2020, Butterworth appeared as Heston in the BBC Two miniseries The North Water alongside Colin Farrell and Stephen Graham. She made her West End debut as Princess Eugenie in the 2021 comedy play The Windsors: Endgame at the Prince of Wales Theatre. Butterworth has an upcoming role in the Sky Max series A Town Called Malice, as announced in January 2022, playing Carly of the Lord family, in a cast which includes Jason Flemyng, Daniel Sharman and Dougray Scott.

Butterworth began filming in January 2022 of the film Seven Kings Must Die a feature length movie involving the surviving members of the television series The Last Kingdom, due for release in 2023.

Personal life
As of 2019, Butterworth is based in London. She is also an alto and mezzo-soprano singer, ballroom and flamenco dancer, and plays percussion.

Filmography

Film

Television

Stage

Awards and nominations

References

External links

Emptag Hallett Talent Company – Eliza Butterworth
Aelswith – Eliza Butterworth
A Day In The Life with Eliza Butterworth

1993 births
Living people
Actors from Lincoln, England
Actresses from Lincolnshire
Alumni of RADA
English people of American descent
English people of Italian descent
English television actresses
21st-century English actresses
People educated at Lincoln Minster School